Kari Jorun Blakkisrud Hag (born April 4, 1941) is a Norwegian mathematician known for her research in complex analysis on quasicircles and quasiconformal mappings, and for her efforts for gender equality in mathematics. She is a professor emerita of mathematics at the Norwegian University of Science and Technology (NTNU). With Frederick Gehring she is the author of the book The Ubiquitous Quasidisk (American Mathematical Society, 2012).

Education and career
Hag is originally from Eidsvoll. Following this, she
earned her doctorate in 1972 from the University of Michigan. Her dissertation, Quasiconformal Boundary Correspondences and Extremal Mappings, was supervised by Gehring.

After completing her doctorate, she joined the Norwegian Institute of Technology (NTH), which later became part of NTNU. She became a full professor at NTNU in 2001, and retired as a professor emerita in 2011.

Awards and honors
NTNU gave Hag their gender equality award in 2000, for her efforts to increase the interest of girls in science and mathematics.
In 2018 she was elected as a knight in the Order of St. Olav.

References

1941 births
Living people
People from Eidsvoll
Norwegian mathematicians
Women mathematicians
University of Oslo alumni
University of Michigan alumni
Order of Saint Olav
Academic staff of the Norwegian Institute of Technology
Academic staff of the Norwegian University of Science and Technology